The James Madison Dukes softball team represents James Madison University in NCAA Division I college softball. The team participates in the Sun Belt Conference (SBC) and plays home games in Veterans Memorial Park. JMU has won six CAA championships, including back-to-back Championships in 2016 and 2017. The Dukes have been to the NCAA Division I softball tournament nine times, hosting Regionals and Super Regionals in 2016. The team's head coach is Loren LaPorte, leading the Dukes to a 148–34 record in four seasons.

Coaching history

Season Results

2021 Season

After a dominant performance in the regular season, the Dukes entered the postseason with a 34–1 record. In the CAA tournament, the Dukes beat Delaware for their sixth conference title and were rewarded with the conference's automatic bid to the NCAA softball tournament. 

The Dukes advanced to the Super Regionals after beating #9 Tennessee and #25 Liberty twice in the Knoxville Regional. They then went on to beat #8 Mizzou on the road in the best-of-three series in Columbia, Missouri.

After punching their ticket to the Women's College World Series (WCWS) for the first time, the James Madison Dukes advanced to the WCWS semifinals after beating #1 Oklahoma 4–3 in eight innings and #5 Oklahoma State 2–1 in the first and second rounds of the tournament. In doing so, they became the first-ever unseeded team to start 2–0 in the WCWS and reach the semifinal games. Their historic run came to a close just short of the finals, falling to eventual champions #1 Oklahoma twice.

Championships

Conference Championships

Notable players

National awards 

NFCA National Player of the Year
Megan Good (2017)

Softball America Pitcher of the Year
Odicci Alexander (2021)

D1 Softball's Woman of the Year
 Odicci Alexander (2021)

All-Americans 
 2014: Jailyn Ford (2nd team)
 2015: Megan Good (2nd team) 
 2015: Jailyn Ford (3rd team)
 2016: Jailyn Ford (1st team)
 2016: Megan Good (1st team) 
 2017: Megan Good (1st team) 
 2018: Megan Good (1st team)
 2018: Odicci Alexander (3rd team)
 2018: Kate Gordon (3rd team)
 2019: Odicci Alexander (3rd team)
 2019: Megan Good (3rd team)
 2019: Kate Gordon (3rd team)
 2021: Odicci Alexander (2nd team)

Coaching Staff Awards
 NFCA Division I National Coaching Staff of the Year (2021)
NFCA Northeast Coaching Staff of the Year (2021)

References